In Greek mythology, Candybus (Ancient Greek: Κάνδυβος) was a Phthian prince.

Family 
Candybus was the son of the King Deucalion and Pyrrha, daughter of the Titan Epimetheus and Pandora. He was the possible brother of Hellen, Amphictyon, Pandora II, Protogeneia, Thyia and Melantho.

Mythology 
The town of Candyba in Lycia was believed to have received its name from Candybus.

Note

Reference 

 Stephanus of Byzantium, Stephani Byzantii Ethnicorum quae supersunt, edited by August Meineike (1790–1870), published 1849. A few entries from this important ancient handbook of place names have been translated by Brady Kiesling. Online version at the Topos Text Project.

Princes in Greek mythology
Deucalionids
Thessalian characters in Greek mythology
Thessalian mythology